Chungseon of Goryeo (20 October 1275 – 23 June 1325)  (r. 1298 and 1308 – 1313), born Wang Won (Hangul: 왕원, Hanja: 王謜), later changed his name to Wang Jang (Hangul: 왕장, Hanja: 王璋), was the 26th ruler of the Goryeo Dynasty of Korea. He is sometimes known by his Mongolian name, Ijir Bukhqa (Hangul: 익지례보화, Hanja: 益知禮普花, Romanization: Ikjiryebohwa). Adept at calligraphy and painting, rather than politics, he generally preferred the life in Khanbaliq (the capital of the Yuan Empire, present-day Beijing) to that in Gaegyeong (the capital of Goryeo, present-day Kaesong). He was the eldest son of King Chungryeol; his mother was Queen Jangmok, a daughter of Kublai Khan, also known by her Mongolian name, Borjigin Qutlugh Kelmysh.

Biography
In 1277, King Chungseon was confirmed as Crown Prince; the following year he travelled to China and received his Mongolian name.

In 1296, he married Borjigin Budashiri, a Yuan princess and great-granddaughter of Kublai Khan. However, he already had three Korean wives, who were daughters of the powerful nobles.

King Chungseon's mother died in 1297, and this was followed by a violent purge brought on by allegations that she had been murdered. Perhaps upset by these events, King Chungnyeol petitioned Yuan to abdicate the throne and was accordingly replaced by his son in 1298. Faced with intense plotting between the faction of his Mongol Queen and his Korean wife, Royal Consort Jo of the Pungyang Jo clan, King Chungseon returned the throne to his father shortly thereafter.

He received a new title, the Prince of Shenyang, in 1307 or 1308. After his father's death in 1308, King Chungseon was obliged to return to the throne of Goryeo and made efforts to reform court politics, but spent as much time as possible in China. In 1310, his Chinese title was changed to Prince of Shen. He is a very rare case of personal unions in East Asia.

He retired from the throne in 1313, and was replaced by his son, Wang Do. After the death of Emperor Renzong of Yuan (元仁宗), King Chungseon was briefly sent into exile to Tibet (lately Sakya), but was permitted to return to Khanbaliq soon thereafter, where he died in 1325.

Family
Father: Chungnyeol of Goryeo (고려 충렬) (1236 – 1308)
Grandfather: Wonjong of Goryeo (고려 원종) (1219 – 1274)
Grandmother: Queen Jeongsun of the Gyeongju Kim clan (정순왕후 경주 김씨) (1222 – 1237)
Mother: Queen Jangmok of the Yuan Borjigin clan (장목왕후 패아지근씨) (1251 – 1297)
Grandfather: Kublai Khan of Yuan (쿠빌라이 칸) (1215 – 1294)
Grandmother: Chabi Khatun of Yuan (차비 카툰) (1216-1281)
Consorts and their respective issue:
Borjigin Budashiri, Princess Supreme of Gye State (보르지긴 부다시리 계국대장공주) (d. 1315) – No issue.
Yasokjin, Royal Consort Ui (야속진 의비) (d. 1316)
Wang Gam, Prince Gwangneung (왕감 광릉군)
Wang Do, Chungsuk of Goryeo (왕도 고려 충숙)
Royal Consort Jeong of the Kaeseong Wang clan (정비 개성 왕씨) (d. 1345) – No issue.
Royal Consort Jo of the Pungyang Jo clan (조비 풍양 조씨) – No issue.
Lady Sunhwa, Royal Consort Won of the Namyang Hong clan (순화원비 남양 홍씨) (d. 1306) – No issue.
Royal Consort Sun of the Yangcheon Heo clan (순비 양천 허씨) (1271 – 1335) – No issue.
Royal Consort Suk of the Eonyang Kim clan (숙비 언양 김씨) – No issue.
Unknown
Wang Hye, Prince Deokheung (덕흥군 왕혜)
Princess Suchun (수춘옹주)

Ancestry

Popular culture
Portrayed by Park Yoon-jae in the 2012 SBS TV series Faith.
Portrayed by Moon Woo-jin, Nam Da-reum and Im Si-wan in the 2017 MBC TV series The King in Love.

See also
List of Korean monarchs
Goryeo under Mongol rule

Notes

References

External links
A Study on Relations between Koryo's Policy towards Yuan and Costume Policy under Yuan's Interference (Author: Ahn, Jeong-hee) (Didital Collection, Donga University, South Korea)

1275 births
1325 deaths
13th-century monarchs in Asia
13th-century Korean monarchs
14th-century Korean monarchs